Pauline Lee (born 3 January 1969) is a Taiwanese figure skater. She competed in the ladies' singles event at the 1988 Winter Olympics.

References

1969 births
Living people
Taiwanese female single skaters
Olympic figure skaters of Taiwan
Figure skaters at the 1988 Winter Olympics
Place of birth missing (living people)